Gheerulla is a rural locality in the Sunshine Coast Region, Queensland, Australia.

Geography 
Much of the locality is within the Mapleton National Park, which extends into neighbouring Belli Park, Cooloolabin, and beyond. The Blackall Range runs through the east and north-east of the locality within the national park.

Gheerulla has the following mountains and cliffs:

 Mount Thilba Thalba 

 Gheerulla Bluff

 Rocky Bluff

History 
Gheerulla is an Aboriginal word meaning empty creek.

The Blackall Range was named in 1868 by Edward Parker Bedwell, a hydrographic surveyor in the Royal Navy,  after the Governor of Queensland Samuel Wensley Blackall.

St Matthew's Anglican Church was dedicated on 28 June 1926 by Archbishop Gerald Sharp. 200 people attended the opening. Its closure circa 2015 was approved by Bishop Jonathan Holland. The church was at 2210 Eumundi Kenilworth Road on a  site. It was sold on 14 March 2016 for $210,000.

Attractions 
There are a number of lookouts in Gheerulla.

Gheerulla Valley Viewpoint is a lookout.

Oaky Creek Lookout is a lookout. The name is presumed to refer to nearby Oaky Creek.

Thilba Thalba Viewpoint is a lookout. The name was suggested by the Sunshine Coast Environment Council as part of the Great Walk Project believed to have been found on an old map and probably of Aboriginal origin.

Ubajee Viewpoint is a lookout. Ubajee is an Aboriginal word in the Gubbi Gubbi and Butchulla languages meaning home. It is pronounced yu'ba'djee.

The rugged Sunshine Coast Hinterland Great Walk takes at least four days to complete. It leaves from Baroon Pocket Dam and traverses  through the Blackall Range.  Sections 2, 3 and 4 of the Great Walk pass through this area.

See also 

 List of long-distance hiking tracks in Australia
 Long-distance trail
 Walking
 Hiking
 Backpacking

References 

Suburbs of the Sunshine Coast Region
Localities in Queensland
Hiking and bushwalking tracks in Queensland